The Miller County School District is a public school district in Miller County, Georgia, United States, based in Colquitt. It serves the communities of Boykin and Colquitt.

Schools
The Miller County School District has one elementary school, one middle school, and one high school.

Elementary school
Miller County Elementary School

Middle school
Miller County Middle School

High school
Miller County High School

Gallery

References

External links

School districts in Georgia (U.S. state)
Education in Miller County, Georgia